Biedma may refer to:

Places 
 Biedma Department, a department located in the north east of Chubut Province, on the Atlantic coast of Argentina

People 
 Esperanza Aguirre Gil de Biedma
 Jaime Gil de Biedma, Spanish poet
 Juan "Hungrybox" Debiedma, professional Super Smash Bros. player

See also 
Viedma (disambiguation)